Christoffer Svae (born 21 March 1982) is a Norwegian curler from Oslo. He is best known as the former second for Team Thomas Ulsrud.

At Junior level, Svae played second for Team Thomas Løvold and won gold medals at the 2002 and 2003 World Junior Curling Championships "B" tournaments.

Svae formally joined Team Ulsrud in 2007 having played alternate since 2005. During the 2005–2010 seasons, Svae and his team won six World Curling Tour events, three European Curling Championship medals (silver in 2007 and 2008; bronze in 2009), four World Curling Championship medals (bronze in 2006, 2008 and 2009; silver in 2010), and silver at the 2010 Vancouver Winter Olympics.

It was Svae who selected Loudmouth Golf's colorful argyle pants (Dixie and Red & Gray) as Team Norway's uniform at the 2010 Vancouver Winter Olympics because they came close to matching the Norwegian flag colors – red, white and blue. The pants brought Team Norway unprecedented popularity as shown by the surge in sales at Loudmouth Golf as well as the number of followers at the Facebook's Norwegian Olympic Curling Team's Pants fan page exceeding over 600,000 by the end of the 2009-10 curling season.

Personal life
Svae is currently employed as a curling instructor and event manager at AS Curlingbaner.

Teams

References

External links
 
 
 
 
 Facebook fan page for The Norwegian Olympic Curling Team's Pants
 Complete coverages of Team Norway's Olympics performances at the official Vancouver Olympic Games 2010 Channel
 Team Ulsrud in training on Eurosport Norge. "EurosportNorge møter curlinggutta". 4 December 2009.
 Team Norway interviewed on Grand Slam of Curling. Olympic Curling – Team Norway. 17 February 2010.
 Christoffer Svae interviewed on ABC News (Video). "The Conversation: pants from the curlers of Norway. 26 February 2010.

Norwegian male curlers
Living people
1982 births
Curlers at the 2010 Winter Olympics
Curlers at the 2014 Winter Olympics
Curlers at the 2018 Winter Olympics
Olympic curlers of Norway
Olympic silver medalists for Norway
Olympic medalists in curling
Sportspeople from Oslo
Medalists at the 2010 Winter Olympics
World curling champions
Continental Cup of Curling participants
European curling champions
Universiade medalists in curling
Universiade silver medalists for Norway
Competitors at the 2009 Winter Universiade